Alexander Gordon Cowie (27 February 1889 – 7 April 1916) was an English first-class cricketer, soldier and poet.

Cowie was educated at Charterhouse School and Caius College, Cambridge. A tall, strongly built right-arm fast bowler who could bowl "alarmingly fast", he made his first-class debut for Cambridge University in 1910 and was awarded his blue.

He made nine first-class appearances for Cambridge University in the 1910 and 1911 seasons, taking 43 wickets at an average of 23.25. His best figures were 6 for 87 off 18.5 overs against Sussex in his second match; five of his victims were bowled. In his next match, immediately afterwards, he took 5 for 64 and 4 for 89 (match figures of 37.4–7–153–9) to lead Cambridge to a nine-wicket victory over Yorkshire. Later in 1910 he played two matches for Hampshire in the County Championship, taking 5 for 94 in Lancashire's first innings in the second match. He lost form in 1911.

With the onset of the First World War Cowie was commissioned in the British Army. He became a captain in the Seaforth Highlanders. He was wounded in 1915, but returned to active duty. He died on 7 April 1916 after being fatally wounded while serving in Mesopotamia. A short poem of his, titled "Lines by Captain Alexander Gordon Cowie, Seaforth Highlanders", appeared after his death in The Lotus Magazine and has since been anthologized in books of war poetry.

References

External links
 
Alexander Cowie at Cricinfo
Alexander Cowie at CricketArchive

1889 births
1916 deaths
People from Lymington
English cricketers
Cambridge University cricketers
Hampshire cricketers
British Army cricketers
British Army personnel of World War I
Seaforth Highlanders officers
British military personnel killed in World War I
Oxford and Cambridge Universities cricketers
People educated at Charterhouse School
Alumni of Gonville and Caius College, Cambridge
English World War I poets
Military personnel from Hampshire